Digging up the Marrow is a 2014 American horror comedy film written and directed by Adam Green.  It stars Green as a fictionalized version of himself who, in the process of making a documentary about monsters, is contacted by a man, played by Ray Wise, who insists that he can prove monsters are real.

Plot 

Filmmaker Adam Green begins a documentary about artwork that features monsters.  Green is surprised when William Dekker, a retired detective, contacts him and claims to have proof of the existence of monsters.  Green's wife reacts skeptically, but he reworks his documentary to focus on Dekker and his efforts to expose the monsters' underground home, which he calls "The Marrow". Green interviews Dekker at his house, who claims that he has seen many monsters and identified some of them through sketches. Dekker mentions his son once but diverts from the topic when Green inquires. The shooting crew of Green and his cameraman wait at the Marrow's entrance; a dug-up hole in the cemetery in the woods. On the first night they do not see anything although Dekker keeps claiming that he could see one of the monsters.

Next time they do capture a footage of a monster for a brief time interval, but there is a disbelief as to whether it is a hoax setup by Dekker. Then they make an arrangement of five cameras and light to capture footage in the absence of their cameraman. One of the cameras, Camera-2, goes missing. Other cameras capture monsters, and later reveals that Dekker visits often and communicates, or feeds, one of the monsters at the Marrow. However the footage is not very clear. Meanwhile, Green finds out that Dekker had approached other directors with his story and the Boston police department do not recognize him. This arouses suspicion and Green tries to gather more footage to confirm hoax (or reality) at the Marrow one night with his cameraman. Dekker arrives there too, and soon they are violently attacked by monsters. They escape in their car. Green and his cameraman leave the house. Next morning they find that Dekker has abandoned the house and they couldn't trace him. However, there is a room with broken chains, implying a monster had been trapped there. Dekker probably believes that one of the monsters is his son and used to trap him there. The movie ends with footage from camera-2 showing a monster that keeps Dekker trapped in a cage, and attacks Green at his home.

Cast 

Tony Todd, Steve Agee, Joe Lynch, Lloyd Kaufman, Don Coscarelli, Corri English, Oderus Urungus, Laura Ortiz, Evan Dickson, and Steven Barton all cameo as themselves.

Production 
The initial concept for the film came from fan mail sent by Alex Pardee that purported to tell the true history of a character Green had created, Victor Crowley.  Green was taken with the mail and wanted to interview the author, but he could not interest anyone else in the project, as they were worried that the fan could turn out to be unbalanced.  The project further coalesced when Green met Pardee at a convention.  Pardee, an artist, shared his story Digging Up the Marrow, in which an artist is commissioned to paint purportedly real monsters.  Green then combined the two ideas.  Casting for Dekker was difficult for the filmmakers, because they were not sure whether they should use an unknown or a famous actor.  Ultimately, they decided that it would be too distracting for audiences to suddenly be taken out of the film when real monsters were introduced.  As a result, Wise was cast so that it would be obvious from the start that the film was not an attempted hoax.  Though Wise's casting was initially controversial among people to whom Green showed a work print, they came around to his point of view when he explained the reasoning.  Of casting himself, Green said that it grounded the film and made the events seem more real.  When writing the script, Green wanted to make sure that the in-jokes did not impact on the enjoyment of general audiences unfamiliar with his work.  Green said that they were added bonuses for fans who noticed them.

Production began in 2010 and slowly progressed over the next four years whenever Green had free time between projects.  Green suffered two major setbacks during filming: the death of his friend Dave Brockie, and his divorce from Rileah Vanderbilt.  Both events caused him to question the project, and he was tempted to remove their scenes.  In both cases, he was convinced not to.  In order to keep a low profile, Green announced that he was making an art documentary.  He said this because he believed that the only way the film could work was if it were not hyped, and he knew that the film would attract unwanted attention if its true subject matter were leaked.  The opening interviews were unscripted, but everything else was.  The actors were not given a full script but had to work with only their own lines.  Barratt was the only actor who read the entire script.  Despite some reviews that praised the film as a guerrilla production, it was not.

Most of the film's effects were practical.  Sculptor Greg Aronowitz worked off of Pardee's designs, and Pardee supervised.  Robert Pendergraft created the make-up effects, fabricated the monsters, and operated them.  Green knew that he would have to show monsters in a self-described monster film, but the team had difficulty in creating working animatronic monsters, as Pardee's designs were so surreal.  Green said there were no ego issues involved in the process, and Pardee and Aronowitz still enjoy collaborating in their spare time for fun.  When each monster was designed, it would inspire different monsters.  Green said that he wanted to use monster designs that were unique, instead of redoing designs that had been seen many times before.  According to Green, because the studios were uninterested in original designs, the film was only possible as an independent production.

Release 
An early cut was shown at Butt-Numb-A-Thon in 2013.  Digging up the Marrow premiered at the London FrightFest Film Festival on August 23, 2014. In October 2014, Image Entertainment purchased the distribution rights to the film. It was released to video on demand on February 20, 2015, and Green went on a tour to distribute the film.  Green said of the self-distribution that it is impossible to get a fair deal with sites like Netflix and Hulu without a major distributor.  In order to avoid these poor deals and issues with distributors who claim to have not made any money, they decided to handle everything themselves.  It was released on DVD and Blu-ray on March 24, 2015.  This version contains 25–30 minutes of extended footage that was cut from the film.

Reception 
Rotten Tomatoes, a review aggregator, reports that 60% of 20 surveyed critics gave the film a positive review; the average rating is 5.7/10. Metacritic rated it 45/100 based on eight reviews. Frank Scheck of The Hollywood Reporter called it "a playfully self-reflexive exercise whose endless in-jokes will best be appreciated by only the most ardent genre aficionados".  Maitland McDonagh of Film Journal International wrote, "A meta-variation on Clive Barker's Nightbreed, Digging Up the Marrow tackles all the same questions–what makes a monster, are they good or bad, et al.—with considerably less grace and intelligence."  Michael Rechtshaffen of the Los Angeles Times called it "more mind-numbing than bone-chilling".  Nick Schager of The Village Voice wrote that after poking fun at found footage films, it becomes "the very dull, clichéd thing it mocks."  Ignatiy Vishnevetsky of The A.V. Club rated it B− and called it "more playful than genuinely creepy" and said that it does not live up to its potential. Ken W. Hanley of Fangoria rated it 2.5/4 stars and described its ambition as both its greatest asset and downfall.  Simon Abrams of RogerEbert.com rated it 1.5/4 stars and wrote, "Digging Up the Marrow is a decent idea, but beyond some fun creature effects, and a surprisingly grounded performance from character actor Ray Wise, the film just sits there."  Wes Greene of Slant Magazine rated it 2/4 stars and said that it "ultimately becomes the shopworn horror story that Green purports to upend with plenty of self-aware snark".  Matt Donato of We Got This Covered rated it 3.5/5 stars and called it "a tense, confident, and gorgeously terrifying monster movie that turns Alex Pardee's artistry into vibrant, eye-catching horrors."  Mike D'Angelo of The Dissolve rated it 3/5 stars and called it "more of an affectionate comedy than a horror movie, despite a third act that features some tense moments and hostile critters."  Patrick Cooper of Bloody Disgusting rated it 2/5 stars and wrote that the film "can be very fun at times, but overall Digging Up the Marrow is a tiresome and exasperatingly self-aggrandizing trip."  Scott Hallam of Dread Central rated it 4/5 stars and wrote, "Not only is it an extremely clever and unique movie experience, it gives Green’s fans exactly what they want: more Adam Green."  Patrick Bromley of Daily Dead rated it 4/5 stars and wrote, "Digging Up the Marrow isn't just a terrific horror movie; it's a movie about why we are drawn to horror movies."

References

External links 
 
 
 
 

2014 films
2014 horror films
American independent films
Found footage films
American mockumentary films
American monster movies
2010s monster movies
2010s English-language films
Films directed by Adam Green
2010s American films